Kesha is an American singer, songwriter, rapper, and actress. She has appeared in 35 music videos, 8 of them being guest appearances. She has appeared in a total of 7 films. She has also appeared in multiple television shows such as Nashville, RuPaul's Drag Race, Jane the Virgin, Victorious, and more.

She first made a cameo appearance in Katy Perry's "I Kissed a Girl" music video, though she was unknown then. Kesha declined to appear in the music video to Flo Rida's massively successful single "Right Round", to which she provided guest vocals to.

In 2009, Kesha released the music video for her debut single, "Tik Tok". Her song "Backstabber" was scheduled to be the second single from her debut studio album, Animal, but it was scrapped in place for "Blah Blah Blah" featuring 3OH!3. The music video was filmed and was leaked online. In 2010, she released the videos for "Blah Blah Blah", "Your Love Is My Drug", & "Take It Off", all taken from Animal. She later appeared as a featured artist in the music videos for "Dirty Picture" with Taio Cruz and "My First Kiss" with 3OH!3. Later that same year, she released music videos for the songs "Animal", "Stephen" and a second music video for "Take It Off", dubbed the "K$ N' Friends version", which featured Jeffree Star, all from her album Animal. Lastly, Kesha released the music video for "We R Who We R", from her debut extended play, Cannibal.

In the following year, Kesha released the music video for the second single from Cannibal, "Blow", which featured actor James Van Der Beek playing Kesha's comedic rival. She guest starred as herself in the Nickelodeon show, Victorious in the episode "Ice Cream for Ke$ha" where the main characters search for the letters to Kesha's name to win a private concert.

In 2012, Kesha released a music video for "Sleazy Remix 2.0: Get Sleazier" featuring rappers Wiz Khalifa, T.I., André 3000, & Lil Wayne, though none of the rappers actually appear in the video. Instead, many other friends of Kesha's mouth the lyrics to the song, while Kesha herself only appears for a short time in the video. She released the music video for the lead single from her second studio album, Warrior, "Die Young" which depicted her as a cult leader in Mexico.

In 2013, she released the music videos for the singles "C'Mon" and "Crazy Kids", the latter featuring rapper will.i.am from the album Warrior. She then went on to appear in the music video for "Timber" alongside Pitbull in which she also provided guest vocals to. Later for New Years, Kesha made her directorial debut with the music video for "Dirty Love", though this version of the song did not include Iggy Pop, rather a solo version was used instead.

After leaving rehab for her eating disorder in 2014, Kesha became a judge for the reality singing competition show, Rising Star. The other judging panel consisted of Ludacris and Brad Paisley with Josh Groban as the host. The show was canceled after one season. Kesha and her cat, Mr. Peeps, made a cameo appearance in the music video for "My Song 5" by HAIM.

In 2015, Kesha appeared in the mid-credits scene of the film Jem and the Holograms as Pizzazz, the leader of the rival band to Jem and the Holograms, The Misfits.

In 2017, Kesha released her comeback single, "Praying" after not releasing any new solo work in five years. She released the accompanying music video along with two more for "Woman" and "Learn to Let Go" from her third studio album Rainbow. The music video for "Hymn" was filmed but it wasn't released until the following year. She appeared in the music video, "Good Old Days", her song with Macklemore.

In 2018, Kesha released the music video for her cover of Janis Joplin's "I Need A Man To Love", retitled "I Need A Woman To Love" from the LGBTQ inclusive EP, Universal Love - Wedding Songs Reimagined. On August 10, 2018, she released her documentary short film Rainbow - The Film on Apple Music. It follows her personal struggles, the creation of Rainbow, and her performance at the Grammy's. Kesha also appeared in the music video for the duet version of The Struts' "Body Talks" in August. The official music video for the song "Here Comes the Change" for the film On the Basis of Sex was live streamed on October 24, 2018 on her YouTube.

Music videos

As lead artist

As featured artist

Guest appearances

Films

Television

References

Kesha
Videographies of American artists